The Waukesha S.T.E.M. Academy (WSA) is a charter school in Waukesha, Wisconsin, in the Waukesha School District.  It was opened in 2009, and multi-age learning groups were introduced in 2013.

The school has two campuses: the Randall Campus (K-5) and the Saratoga Campus (6-8). Its emphasis is on a STEM curriculum (science, technology, engineering, and mathematics).

References

Schools in Waukesha County, Wisconsin
Waukesha, Wisconsin
2009 establishments in Wisconsin
Educational institutions established in 2009